Double Take is an Australian sketch comedy series which premiered on the Seven Network on 23 July 2009. The series ended just over two months later on 24 September 2009.

Although it was a show of mixed quality and only passable ratings, it featured a number of sketches (notably, the song "9 to 9" (parodying Dolly Parton's "9 to 5") that became highly popular viral internet items, and led to the appearance of two of the programme's stars, Amanda Bishop and Paul McCarthy, in the ABC1 sitcom At Home With Julia (2011), in turn, co-written and produced by one of the show's co-creators, Rick Kalowski.

Cast
 Hollie Andrew
 Amanda Bishop
 Helen Dallimore
 Guy Edmonds
 Robin Goldsworthy
 Paul McCarthy
 Darren Weller

Format
Double Take involves the presentation of a variety of skits, parodying famous people and television shows. Instead of fewer, longer sketches, episodes are usually structured to include many skits with longer sketches broken up into segments often concluding after a second or third run.

Impersonations

Notable programs
Double Take features original skits, parodies of other television programmes and films.

There are parodies of community television's Channel 31 or many TV shows on other networks (such as Channel 7, 9, 10, SBS and the ABC). As well as various sport coverage or news bulletins, and Australian films to classic movies.

Reception
The debut episode of Double Take rated reasonably well, attracting an audience of 1.08 million people and winning the night among the coveted 25- to 54-year-old viewers' demographic. Subsequent ratings varied wildly between as many as 1,000,000 and as few as 400,000 viewers, although the show remained very popular among younger viewers throughout its run.

Surprisingly, for a sketch comedy show (typically regarded by critics as a 'low art'), Double Take was well received by reviewers writing for Australia's major broadsheet newspapers The Sydney Morning Herald, The Age and The Australian, while earning negative criticism only from the more tabloid Daily Telegraph.

External links

Australian television sketch shows
2009 Australian television series debuts
2009 Australian television series endings
Television series by Fremantle (company)
Television shows set in Australia
Seven Network original programming